The Southern California Association of Governments (SCAG) is the Metropolitan Planning Organization (MPO) of six of the ten counties in Southern California, serving Imperial County, Los Angeles County, Orange County, Riverside County, San Bernardino County, and Ventura County. San Diego County's MPO is the San Diego Association of Governments, which is an unrelated agency.

As the designated MPO, SCAG is mandated by the federal government to research and draw up plans for transportation, growth management, hazardous waste management, and air quality. Additional mandates exist at the state level

Governance 

SCAG's policy direction is guided by the 86-member official governing board known as the Regional Council. The Regional Council is composed of 67 Districts that include an elected representative of one or more cities of approximately equal population levels that have a geographic community of interest (except the City of Long Beach, which has two representatives). Additionally, membership in SCAG's Regional Council includes one representative from each county Board of Supervisors (except the County of Los Angeles, which has two representatives). SCAG's Regional Council also includes one representative of the Southern California Native American Tribal Governments. Finally, all members of the Los Angeles City Council are each considered members of the SCAG Regional Council, and the Mayor of the City of Los Angeles, serves as the Los Angeles City At-Large Representative.

SCAG Member Cities 

As of December 2014, the SCAG region consists of 191 cities, six counties, and one Tribal Government. Members include:

 Adelanto
 Agoura Hills
 Alhambra
 Aliso Viejo
 Anaheim
 Apple Valley
 Arcadia
 Artesia
 Avalon
 Azusa
 Baldwin Park
 Banning
 Barstow
 Beaumont
 Bell
 Bell Gardens
 Bellflower
 Beverly Hills
 Big Bear Lake
 Blythe
 Bradbury
 Brawley
 Brea
 Buena Park
 Burbank
 Calabasas
 Calexico
 Calimesa
 Calipatria
 Camarillo
 Canyon Lake
 Carson
 Cathedral City
 Cerritos
 Chino
 Chino Hills
 Claremont
 Coachella
 Colton
 Commerce
 Compton
 Corona
 Costa Mesa
 Covina
 Cudahy
 Culver City
 Cypress
 Dana Point
 Desert Hot Springs
 Diamond Bar
 Downey
 Duarte
 Eastvale
 El Centro
 El Monte
 El Segundo
 Fillmore
 Fontana
 Fountain Valley
 Fullerton
 Garden Grove
 Gardena
 Glendale
 Glendora
 Grand Terrace
 Hawaiian Gardens
 Hawthorne
 Hemet
 Hermosa Beach
 Hesperia
 Hidden Hills
 Highland
 Holtville
 Huntington Beach
 Huntington Park
 Imperial
 Indian Wells
 Indio
 Industry
 Inglewood
 Irvine
 Irwindale
 Jurupa Valley
 La Cañada Flintridge
 La Habra
 La Habra Heights
 La Mirada
 La Palma
 La Puente
 La Quinta
 La Verne
 Laguna Beach
 Laguna Hills
 Laguna Niguel
 Laguna Woods
 Lake Elsinore
 Lake Forest
 Lakewood
 Lancaster
 Lawndale
 Loma Linda
 Lomita
 Long Beach
 Los Alamitos
 Los Angeles
 Lynwood
 Malibu
 Manhattan Beach
 Maywood
 Menifee
 Mission Viejo
 Monrovia
 Montclair
 Montebello
 Monterey Park
 Moorpark
 Moreno Valley
 Murrieta
 Needles
 Newport Beach
 Norco
 Norwalk
 Ojai
 Ontario
 Oxnard
 Palm Desert
 Palm Springs
 Palmdale
 Palos Verdes Estates
 Paramount
 Pasadena
 Perris
 Pico Rivera
 Placentia
 Pomona
 Port Hueneme
 Rancho Cucamonga
 Rancho Mirage
 Rancho Palos Verdes
 Redlands
 Redondo Beach
 Rialto
 Riverside
 Rolling Hills
 Rolling Hills Estates
 Rosemead
 San Bernardino
 San Buenaventura
 San Clemente
 San Dimas
 San Fernando
 San Gabriel
 San Jacinto
 San Juan Capistrano
 San Marino
 Santa Ana
 Santa Clarita
 Santa Fe Springs
 Santa Monica
 Santa Paula
 Seal Beach
 Sierra Madre
 Signal Hill
 Simi Valley
 South El Monte
 South Gate
 South Pasadena
 Stanton
 Temecula
 Temple City
 Thousand Oaks
 Torrance
 Tustin
 Twentynine Palms
 Upland
 Vernon 
 Victorville
 Villa Park
 Walnut
 West Covina
 West Hollywood
 Westlake Village
 Westminster
 Westmorland
 Whittier
 Wildomar
 Yorba Linda
 Yucaipa
 Yucca Valley
 Pechanga Band of Luiseño Indians

History 

The Southern California Association of Governments was formed on October 28, 1965, with the purpose of conducting growth forecasts and regional planning. With each new federal transportation authorization and key state legislation, SCAG’s roles and responsibilities have increased and expanded beyond transportation planning.

In recent years, SCAG has taken a leadership role in goods movement activities and its impact on the Southern California region. In 2008, the California State Legislature passed SB 375, which sets a framework and target dates to achieve Green House Gas reductions. This legislation impacts transportation planning, growth and development, housing, and land use decisions. It also expands the role of SCAG in setting regional targets.

See also

 Hal Bernson, Los Angeles City Council member, 1979–2003, former SCAG chairman

References

.Government
Local government in California
Metropolitan planning organizations
Government of Los Angeles County, California
Government of San Bernardino County, California
Government of Ventura County, California
Government in Riverside County, California
Government of Imperial County, California
Government in Orange County, California
 
Transportation in Southern California
Transportation planning